Volker Frischke (born c. 1944) is a German swimmer who won a bronze medal in the 4×200 m freestyle relay at the 1962 European Aquatics Championships. He also won two national titles in the 200 m butterfly event in 1962 and 1963.

After retirement from competition he worked as a swimming coach, eventually becoming a national team coach and a top manager of SC Dynamo Berlin, the club where he trained. He was involved in the East German doping program. In October 1997 he was charged with giving anabolic steroids to teenager swimmers without the knowledge (the drugs were said to be vitamin supplements) thereby causing bodily harm. As a result, he was relieved from coaching duties and fined for DM 5,000, without receiving a criminal record. His past trainees included Kerstin Kielgass, Daniela Hunger and Manuela Stellmach.

References

Living people
German male swimmers
German male freestyle swimmers
Male medley swimmers
European Aquatics Championships medalists in swimming
1944 births